Real Avilés Club de Fútbol is a Spanish football team based in Avilés, in the autonomous community of Asturias. Founded in 1903 it plays in Segunda División RFEF – Group 1, holding home matches at Estadio Román Suárez Puerta, with an approximate capacity of 5,400 seats.

History

First years
Avilés was founded in 1903 under the name Sport Club Avilesino, hence being considered the oldest football club in Asturias. In 1906 he joins the Sociedad Obrera Industrial as their football section with the name of Círculo Industrial y de Sport de Avilés, but a few years later, the players and managers of the football team decide to become independent again, this time with the name of  Stadium Club Avilesino. 

In 1925 Stadium obtained the royal crown from Alfonso XIII, being renamed Real Stadium Club Avilesino. A new name change took place in 1940, according to a government's prohibition of foreign names, and the club became Real Avilés Club de Fútbol.

Last decades
In 1983 Avilés absorbed Club Deportivo Ensidesa and changed its name again, to Real Avilés Industrial Club de Fútbol. It played in Segunda División B (the third highest level of the league pyramid) for two seasons and returned to that level at the end of the 1987–88 campaign, being crowned champions three years later and thus promoting to Segunda División: after comfortably finishing in midtable in its first season, the team ranked second from bottom in the following, spending a further eight years in the third category then two more from 2002 to 2004, after which it returned to Tercera División (the fourth highest level).

The relegation to Tercera was followed by a serious financial and social crisis in the club, with almost all the supporters leaving the club. In 2010, the board of the club retook its old name Real Avilés Club de Fútbol.

Following an agreement with the investment group "Golplus", Real Avilés failed to promote to Segunda División B in 2012, but the club could buy a vacant berth in the third tier. Two years later, Real Avilés would play the promotion play-offs to Segunda División. They would eliminate FC Cartagena in the first round, but failed in the attempt to beat UE Llagostera in the second one. In October 2014, Golplus would leave the club due to the lack of support and Real Avilés would start a new crisis that ended with the relegation to Tercera División after being beaten in the relegation playoffs by CD Eldense.

On 3 July 2017, the Royal Spanish Football Federation would not allow Real Avilés to register its players in any of the categories due to an unpaid debt of €32,000 to their players. After paying it, the club continued involved in serious internal problems as José María Tejero, owner of the club, and the management group did not reach an agreement. Tejero decided to take the helm of the club despite the opposition of the management group, and without terminating the contract; this action started when during the preseason of the 2017–18 Tercera División, Tejero called private security for not allowing the coaches and the players, contracted by the management group, to train in the municipal facilities.

After this incident, the owner and the management group made a different team each one for playing in the 2017–18 Tercera División. Both hired one coach and signed several players, but finally only the ones contracted by the owner were finally registered.

Club crest
The club changed the crest to the most recent one in 2017. The historical logo that was introduced in 1983, adding garnet colour, the colour of Ensidesa to the crest. However, in circa 2015 the club dropped the colour and restored to the old design. The club also deleted other elements that refer to Ensidesa from the club song.

Before 1983 the club also user a few other design.

Names
 Sport Club Avilesino (1903–1906)
 Círculo Industrial y de Sport de Avilés (1906–1915)
 Stadium Club Avilesino (1915–1925)
 Real Stadium Club Avilesino (1925–1931)
 Stadium Club Avilesino (1931–1940)
 Real Avilés Club de Fútbol (1940–1983)
 Real Avilés Industrial Club de Fútbol (1983–1992)
 Real Avilés Industrial Club de Fútbol, SAD (1992–2010)
 Real Avilés Club de Fútbol, SAD (2010–2020)

Season to season

13 seasons in Segunda División
18 seasons in Segunda División B
2 seasons in Segunda División RFEF
53 seasons in Tercera División

Honours
Segunda División B: 1989–90
Tercera División: 1932–33, 1944–45, 1951–52, 1964–65, 1966–67, 1967–68, 1982–83
Copa RFEF: 2002–03
Copa RFEF (Asturias tournament): 1999, 2001, 2002
Regional Championship of Asturias (2nd division): 1919–20, 1920–21, 1928–29
Spanish Second Division Championship: 1920

Famous players
Note: this list contains players that have played at least 100 league games and/or have reached international status.
 Juanele 
 Marcelino Campanal
 Mauri
 Nicasio Goitisolo

References

External links
 

Football clubs in Asturias
Association football clubs established in 1903
 
Sport in Avilés
1903 establishments in Spain
A
Segunda División clubs